Bédogo-Silmissi is a village in the Kombissiri Department of Bazèga Province in central Burkina Faso. In 2005 the village had an estimated population of 485.

References

Populated places in the Centre-Sud Region
Bazèga Province